Neka (also Romanized as Nekā’ and Nekā; also known as Nīkā; formerly, Nāranj Bāgh) is a city and capital of Neka County, Mazandaran Province, Iran.

At the 2006 census, its population was 46,152, in 11,941 families.

Geography
Neka is located at the foot of and up into the northern Alborz (Elburs) mountain range, south of and near the Caspian Sea coast.

It is noted for its destination spas at natural  hot springs, and the nearby Caspian coastline and Peninsula of Miankaleh.  It is a tourist destination of Mazandaran Province.

History
Not much is known about this area in geographical or historical accounts of the past, until the Qajar dynasty. However, in the geographical records of the early Islamic period, the name Mirdan of a city near the current city of Neka has been mentioned. Deh Khoda has mentioned the River Neka in his encyclopedia. It seems that Neka was a vicinity or 'block' comprising various rural settlements.

The present Neka has sprung up from the village of 'Naranj', alongside a bridge on Neka River within the past 70 years.

Economy
Due to the railway line running across this area, and suitable network of communications, together with the establishment of the wood industry, oil reservoirs and an electric power plant, the area is one of the important developing centers of the province. The said city is also considered as an industrial locality in the northern region

Neka Power Plant
The Neka Power Plant provide energy to the province and some northern parts of the country. It is one of the biggest steam powered thermal power plants in the Middle East, Its nominal capacity is 2035 MW . The main components are : steam pot, middle house, turbine place, converters and auxiliary houses. The main fuel for steam production is natural gas, with light fuel oil a secondary source, both supplied by the Iranian Central Oil Fields Company.

References

 Cultural heritage news agency
 Photos of Sari and Suburbs as taken in the spring of 2003

External links

Cities in Mazandaran Province
Populated places in Neka County
Populated places on the Caspian Sea
Settled areas of Elburz